Baikalides or Baikalide Orogen may refer to: 

Central Asian Orogenic Belt
Timanide Orogen